The Borowiec Astrogeodynamic Observatory is an observatory that forms part of Space Research Centre located in Borówiec, Poland.

External links
 http://www.cbk.poznan.pl (in Polish)

Science and technology in Poland
Astronomical observatories in Poland